Virasat-e-Khalsa is a museum of Sikhism, located in the holy town, Anandpur Sahib, near Chandigarh, the capital of the state of Punjab, India. The museum celebrates 500 years of the Sikh history and the 300th anniversary of the birth of Khalsa, based on the scriptures written by the tenth and last human guru, Guru Gobind Singh Ji. It serves to attract tourists and pilgrims. This results in a consultation between religion and emerging need in the building environment. One side it promotes hand crafts to locals as well as nurturing a sense of heritage, besides it recalls to infinity by the volumetric interference of existing skyline is another phase of a visible Urbanism dilemma.

Structure
There are two complexes at each side of a ravine, connected by a ceremonial bridge:
The smaller western complex includes an entrance plaza, an auditorium with 400 seating-capacity, two-story research and reference library, and changing exhibition galleries.
The eastern complex contains a round memorial building as well as extensive, permanent exhibition space, consisting of two clusters of galleries that try to evoke the fortress architecture of the region (most evident in a nearby Gurudwara) and form a dramatic silhouette against the surrounding cliff terrain. The gathering of the galleries in groups of five reflects the Five Virtues, a central tenet of Sikhism.

The buildings are constructed of poured-in-place concrete; some beams and columns remain exposed, though a great deal of the structures will be clad in a local honey-colored stone. The rooftops are stainless steel-clad and exhibit a double curvature: they gather and reflect the sky while a series of dams in the ravine create pools that reflect the entire complex at night.

Visitor numbers
Visitor numbers have broken records as the museum has been recognised as the most visited museum in the Indian subcontinent. The footfall for a single day on March 20th 2019 was the most ever recorded for a museum in India.

Over 10 million people have visited since its inception 8 years ago.

References

Photographs

History of Sikhism
Rupnagar
Museums in Punjab, India
Art museums and galleries in India
Decorative arts museums in India
Moshe Safdie buildings
Museums established in 2011
2011 establishments in Punjab, India
Religious museums in India